A biblical paraphrase is a literary work which has as its goal, not the translation of the Bible, but rather, the rendering of the Bible into a work that retells all or part of the Bible in a manner that accords with a particular set of theological or political doctrines. Such works "weave with ease and without self-consciousness, in and out of material from the volume we know between hard covers as the Bible ...(bringing it) into play with disparate sources, religious practices, and (prayers)."

History
This type of work was the most common form of biblical literature in Medieval Europe. The Historia scholastica was the most successful biblical paraphrase. The Paraphrases of Erasmus are another notable work. Paraphrases could take the form of poetry, prose, or be written as the lyrics of songs such as the Presbyterian paraphrases.

The Living Bible, first published in 1971, is a modern example of a paraphrase Bible.

References